This list of museums in Sri Lanka contains lists of museums which are defined for this context as institutions (including nonprofit organisations, government entities, and private businesses) that collect and care for objects of cultural, artistic, scientific, or historical interest and make their collections or related exhibits available for public viewing.

National Museums administered by the Department of Museums

National Museums 

 National Museum of Colombo
 National Museum of Kandy
 National Museum of Galle
 National Museum of Ratnapura

Museums of particular subjects 
 National Museum of Natural History, Colombo
 Colombo Dutch Museum
 National Maritime Museum (Galle)
 Independence Memorial Museum
 Folk Museum (Anuradhapura)

Museums administered by the Department of Archaeology

North Central Province 
 Anuradhapura Museum (National)
 Mihintale Museum (Site)
 Veheragala Museum (Site)
 Isurumuniya Museum (Site)
 Tantirimale Museum (Site)

North Western Province 
 Panduwasnuwara Museum (Regional)
 Puttalam Museum (Site)
 Rajanganaya Museum (Site)
 Yapahuwa Museum (Site)
 Dambadeniya Museum (Site)

Central Province 
Kandy Royal Palace Museum (Regional)
Nalanda Museum (Site)
Pidurangala Museum (Site)

Eastern Province 
 Batticaloa Museum. (Site)
 Dighavapi Museum (Regional)
 Seruwila Museum (Site)
 Welgam Vehera Museum (Site)

Western Province 
 Kotte Museum (Regional)

Southern Province 
 Matara Star Fort Museum (Regional)
 Yatala Museum (Site)
 Kasagala Museum (Site)
 Mulkirigala Museum (Site)

Northern Province 
 Jaffna Museum (Regional)
 Vavuniya Museum (Regional)

Uva Province 
 Buduruwagala Museum (Regional)
 Maligawila Museum (Site)

Sabaragamuwa Province 
 Dedigama Museum (Regional)

Museums of particular subjects administered by the institutions of those subjects 

 Ceylon Tea Museum, Kandy
 Colombo Port Maritime Museum, Colombo
 Currency Museum, Colombo
 Highway Museum, Kiribathkumbura
 Hoods Tower Museum, Trincomalee
 International Buddhist Museum, Kandy
 Martin Wickramasinghe Folk Museum, Galle
 Ambalangoda Mask Museum|Mask Museum, Ambalangoda
 Museum of Temple of Tooth, Kandy
 National Telecommunication Museum, Padukka 
 Postal Museum, Colombo
 Railway Museum, Kadugannawa
 S.W.R.D. Bandaranaike and Sirimavo Bandaranaike Memorial Museum, Colombo
 Sri Lanka Air Force Museum, Ratmalana
 Sri Lanka Cricket Museum, Colombo
 Walisinghe Harischandra Museum, Negombo
 Wax Museum, Polonnaruwa

See also 
 Tourism in Sri Lanka
 Culture of Sri Lanka
 List of museums
 Department of National Museum (Sri Lanka)
 Department of Archaeology (Sri Lanka)

References

External links 
 Department of national museums

 
Museums
Sri Lanka
Museums
Museums
Sri Lanka